Fields Heirs, also known as Fields House, was a historic home located at Middletown, New Castle County, Delaware.  It was built about 1820, and was a -story, five-bay by two-bay center-hall plan residence with a -story rear wing forming an L-shaped house. It sat on a stone foundation and had a gable roof.  Also on the property was a contributing drive-through granary.

It was listed on the National Register of Historic Places in 1985 and demolished between 1992 and 2002.

References

Houses on the National Register of Historic Places in Delaware
Houses completed in 1820
Houses in New Castle County, Delaware
National Register of Historic Places in New Castle County, Delaware